Proschaliphora lineata is a moth in the subfamily Arctiinae. It was described by Lars Kühne in 2010. It is found in Namibia.

References

Endemic fauna of Namibia
Moths described in 2010
Arctiini